The DEFA Film Library at the University of Massachusetts Amherst is the only archive and research center outside of Germany devoted to a broad spectrum of filmmaking from and related to the former East Germany (German Democratic Republic - GDR). DEFA was the state owned film company of the GDR. The non-profit organization houses an extensive collection of 35mm and 16mm prints, dcps, DVDs, books, periodicals and articles. Students are involved in all aspects of the archive's research, outreach and teaching activities and also gain valuable non-academic experience in subtitling and library, conference and arts management. In order to fulfill its dual mission—to make DEFA films available and better known, and to broaden understanding of filmmaking in the GDR by interdisciplinary critical scholarship—the DEFA Film Library undertakes a range of scholarly and support activities.

About the DEFA Film Library

History
The DEFA Film Library at UMass Amherst was founded by Barton Byg, professor of film and German Studies at the University of Massachusetts Amherst, in the late 1980s. The signing of an UMass memorandum on September 23, 1993 marks the DEFA Film Library's official founding. Byg's idea was to make films from the East German DEFA Studios more available and widely known in North America and to broaden popular and scholarly understanding of filmmaking in the GDR by critically exploring its aesthetic, political and ideological bases.

DEFA stands for Deutsche Film-Aktiengesellschaft. Founded a year after the end of World War II, it ultimately comprised a group of coordinated, state-run film studios, including, for example, the DEFA Feature and Documentary Film Studios, the Studio for Animation Films, etc. After the fall of the Berlin Wall on November 9, 1989, and German Reunification the following year, it was not clear what would happen to the over 7,500 DEFA films that had been made between 1946 and 1992, as the film rights had belonged to the now-defunct former GDR.

As the post-unification fate of East Germany's film heritage was being decided across the Atlantic, the DEFA Film Library's collection grew bit by bit. In 1997, an agreement with two German partners — Progress Film and the precursor to the DEFA Foundation — brought a collection of East German film journals and the largest collection of 16mm and 35mm prints of DEFA films outside of Germany to the UMass Amherst campus. Also housed in the DEFA Film Library archive are 16mm prints that were donated by the US-GDR Friendship Committee and the former East German Embassy in addition to theatrical films, this part of the collection includes films that were made specifically to report on and represent the GDR overseas. In 1998, ICESTORM International Inc., which owned the international video rights for DEFA films, brought East German titles on video to North America. ICESTORM and the DEFA Film Library collaborated on the selection of 61 titles for the first U.S. release of subtitled DEFA films on video in 1999. On October 1, 2001, the DEFA Film Library took over the distribution of these titles for ICESTORM International. Since 2003, the DEFA Film Library has also been involved in subtitling and producing DEFA films for the North American market, in collaboration with ICESTORM and other licensors.

Circulating Print Archive
The DEFA Film Library's collection of theatrical film prints has now grown to almost 500 prints and have been screened at venues throughout North America, including: The Museum of Modern Art and the New York Jewish Film Festival in New York; the Harvard Film Archive and the Museum of Fine Arts, Boston; the American Film Institute and the National Gallery of Art in Washington, D.C.; the San Francisco Museum of Modern Art; the Museum of Fine Arts, Houston; the Los Angeles County Museum of Art and the Hammer Museum in Los Angeles; the Toronto International Film Festival; the Wexner Center for the Arts in Columbus, Ohio; Real Art Ways in Hartford, Connecticut; and Darkside Cinema in Corvallis, Oregon.

Most visible have been large-scale touring film series that are co-curated by the DEFA Film Library and various partners and premiere at prestigious cultural institutions. In 2005, The Museum of Modern Art and the Goethe-Institut New York presented the most comprehensive retrospective of East German films ever screened in North America, Rebels with a Cause: The Cinema of East Germany. In 2009, a series commemorating the 20th anniversary of the fall of the Wall, WENDE FLICKS: Last Films from East Germany, premiered at the Los Angeles County Museum of Art, the Hammer Museum, the Wende Museum, UCLA and the Goethe-Institut Los Angeles. 
The DEFA Film Library has also curated and hosted the annual film festival at the German Studies Association conference since 2004. (For the list of curated film series, please see below.)

DVD releases with English subtitles
The DEFA Film Library's current DVD distribution catalog includes almost 100 (East) German titles, with 6–8 additional titles released every year. Its DVD line strives to complement films with high-quality bonus features and materials for educators. Highlight releases include:

 Stars
 Beethoven Duet
 The Lost Angel
 Arts in Exil
 The Flying Dutchman
 For Eyes Only
 Käthe Kollwitz
 the 2-DVD educators’ set of Verdict on Auschwitz: The Frankfurt Auschwitz Trial 1963–1965 (Dirs. Rolf Bickel, Dietrich Wagner, 1993 & 2005); 
 the 2-DVD set of Silent Country, Andreas Dresen’s 1992 film debut that also includes an interview with the director and six of his student works; 
 the digitally restored Weimar Republic classic, Kuhle Wampe, or Who Owns the World? (Dir. Slatan Dudow, 1932).

Research at the DEFA Film Library
The on-site research collection also includes over 1,000 DVDs and over 400 articles, books and periodicals (Filmspiegel, Kino DDR, Film und Fernsehen, epd Film, Deutsche Filmkunst). In addition, the Special Collections department at UMass Amherst's W.E.B. Du Bois Library owns the collection "Social Change and Movements for Social Change", which includes a Cold War Culture Collection with an emphasis on East Germany.

Programming for scholars
The DEFA Film Library supports an international network of scholars with a range of regular programming that has helped shape national and international research agendas on (East) German cinema.

 In 1997 and 1999, DFL organized two international conferences on East German cinema in the Five College area, in collaboration with PROGRESS Film-Verleih and the DEFA Foundation in Berlin. It collaborated on a third international conference with the Academy for Film and Television in Potsdam-Babelsberg in November 2011. 
 Since 2001, the DEFA Film Library has hosted a week-long biennial Summer Film Institute for 25–30 researchers. Combining workshop discussions with screenings of a range of films—including little-known and rare titles—the Institutes are known for their stimulation of new research topics. (For a list of Summer Film Institute topics, please see below.)
 The DEFA Film Library organizes or participates in panels and panel series at national conferences.

Visiting Artists and Scholars
The DEFA Film Library Filmmaker's Tours bring German filmmakers to colleges, universities and cultural institutions throughout North America. Featured directors have included Frank Beyer, Jürgen Böttcher, Andreas Dresen, Jörg Foth, Iris Gusner, Helke Misselwitz, Siegfried Kühn, Herrmann Zschoche and Rainer Simon.

Other visiting artists and scholars have included:

 Directors: Egon Günther, Thomas Heise, Dietmar Hochmuth, Günter Jordan, Peter Kahane, Bernd Sahling, Evelyn Schmidt, Andreas Voigt, Lothar Warneke, Lutz Stützner, Gerd Kroske, Vojtěch Jasný.
Film historians and scholars: Monika Albrecht, Seán Allan, Christine Becker, Lothar Bisky, Benita Blessing, Oksana Bulgakova, Burghard Ciesla, Thomas Elsaesser, Thomas Fox, Sabine Hake, Dina Iordanova, Konrad Jarausch, Lars Karl, Heinz Kersten, Mario Kessler, Sylvia Klötzer, Thomas Lindenberger, Claus Löser, Hanno Löwy, Tom Maulucci, Larson Powell, Eric Rentschler, Ralf Schenk, Elke Schieber, Ursula Schröter, Lu Seegers, David Shneer, Frank Stern, Katie Trumpener, Annette Weinke, Johanna Frances Yunker and others.
 Scriptwriters: Wolfgang Kohlhaase, Stefan Kolditz, Helga Schubert, and others.
 Composer: Stefan Carow.

Summer Film Institutes
 2015 | Sex, Gender & Videotape: Love, Eroticism & Romance in East Germany
Facilitated by Victoria Rizo Lenshyn (UMass Amherst), Benita Blessing (Oregon State University) and Kyle Frackman (University of British Columbia)

 2013 | DEFA & Amerika: Culture Wars, Culture Contact
Facilitated by Sky Arndt-Briggs, Sara Lennox, Barton Byg and Victoria Rizo Lenshyn (all UMass Amherst)

 2011 | Cold War, Hot Media – DEFA and the Third World
Facilitated by Sky Arndt-Briggs, Barton Byg and Evan Torner (all UMass Amherst)

 2009 | Rewriting (East) German Cinema: Issues in Film Methodology and Historiography
Facilitated by Sabine Hake (University of Texas at Austin) and Larson Powell (University of Missouri - Kansas City)

 2007 | Solidarity! DEFA & Latin America
Facilitated by Barton Byg and Sky Arndt-Briggs (both UMass Amherst)

 2005 | Changing World, Shifting Narratives: Films and History / Film as History / Film History
Facilitated by Barton Byg (UMass Amherst) and Katie Trumpener (Yale University)

 2003 | DEFA and East European Cinema
Facilitated by Barton Byg (UMass Amherst), Eric Rentschler (Harvard University) and Katie Trumpener (Yale University)

 2001 | Interdisciplinary Approaches to the DEFA Film
Facilitated by Barton Byg (UMass Amherst)

Curated film series

Awarded! East German Films from Behind the Wall 
[2013, premiere Gene Siskel Film Center, Chicago] 
Eight major award-winning films from the GDR in one series, including all the East German titles ever submitted for an Oscar for Best Foreign Language Film.

REEL WOMEN in East Germany 
[2012, premiere at the German Studies Association conference]
Recommendations for programmers and teachers interested in the lives and work—including as filmmakers—of women in the GDR. Suggested thematic groupings for film series, classes and research on a range of topics.

FILM+ART+JAZZ = Jürgen Böttcher STRAWALDE 
[2011, premiere at UMass Amherst] 
Filmmaker and painter, Böttcher/Strawalde has turned eclectic events and materials into painterly films that are known for their striking visual style. Ten films on art, jazz, and Berlin.

Made in East|West Germany 
[2009, premiere at Goethe-Institut Boston]
A joint effort pairing West German films (Goethe-Institut Boston) and East German films (DEFA Film Library) to explore similarities and differences in treatments of a shared past.

WENDE FLICKS: Last Films from East Germany 
[2009, premiere at Los Angeles County Museum of Art & Hammer Museum, Los Angeles] 
9 feature and 4 documentary films made by the last generation of GDR filmmakers in the years surrounding the fall of the Wall and German unification. Organized in collaboration with The Wende Museum, L.A.

REBELS WITH A CAUSE: The Cinema of East Germany  
[2005, premiere at the Museum of Modern Art, New York] 
The most comprehensive retrospective of East German cinema ever screened in the US, co-curated in collaboration with the MoMA and Goethe-Institut New York. 21 films reflect on the politic of filmmaking in the GDR.

Shadows and Sojourners: Images of Jews and Antifascism in East German Film  
[2002, premiere University of Massachusetts Amherst] 
The first retrospective representing the intertwined themes of German/Jewish relations, antifascism, anti-Semitism, and the Holocaust in GDR cinema.

Berlin, Divided Heaven: From the Ice Age to the Thaw 
[1999, premiere at the Northampton International Film Festival] 
The city of Berlin has had a history unlike any other that is told by 16 films produced in both parts of Germany.

Faculty Research Fellows
2014–15	Andy Räder (University of Rostock, Germany)
2011–12	Seán Allan (University of Warwick, UK)
2010–11	Benita Blessing (University of Vienna, Austria)

Recognition and awards
2013, Letter of recognition from Bernd Neumann, Minister of Culture and Media of the Federal Republic of Germany
2011, cinefest Hamburg: Reinhold-Schünzel-Preis to Barton Byg
2005, Recipient of the Programming Award of the DEFA Foundation, Berlin.

Current DEFA team
Barton Byg, Founder
Skyler Arndt-Briggs, Executive Director
Hiltrud Schulz, Production | Outreach | Contracts
Joe Keady, Subtitling | Print Rentals | Conferences
Katrin Bahr, Research Collection | DVD Rentals & Sales
Angel Crockett, Bookkeeping | DVD Sales
Konstanze Schiller | Print Archive 
Colby Makin |Film Archive

See also 
 List of East German films
 Lists of film archives

External links
DEFA Film Library Homepage
Special collections at W.E.B. Du Bois at UMass
Icestorm Entertainment GmbH
Los Angeles Country Museum of Art
Toronto International Film Festival
Wexner Center for the Arts
Real Art Ways
Darkside Cinema
PROGRESS Film-Verleih
DEFA Foundation
The Wende Museum
The German Studies Association
East German Cinema: DEFA and Film History

Cinema of Germany
Film archives in the United States
University of Massachusetts Amherst
DEFA films